The Sil is a river in León (Castile and León) and Galicia, Spain, a tributary of the Miño. The source of the Sil is in the Cantabrian Mountains in the Leonese town of Villablino. It flows through the provinces of León and Ourense. The largest city on the Sil is Ponferrada (León). The Sil flows into the Miño upstream from Ourense.

Mouth
The river joins the Miño river in Os Peares, in the province of Ourense.

Generally, the hierarchy between rivers is performed by taking into account which junction has more volume and length. In this case, as with the Esla and Pisuerga with the Duero, the Sil has flows larger than the Miño at the junction. There is a saying that goes, "The Miño has the fame, but the Sil gives it water" (in Spanish, El Miño lleva la fama y el Sil le da el agua).

Course
The Sil runs through the León districts of Babia, Laciana, El Bierzo and La Cabrera, and Ourense Valdeorras, among other locations across Villablino, Ponferrada, O Barco de Valdeorras, A Rúa, Quiroga and Ribas de Sil.

Tributaries
 Left bank: Valseco, Boeza, Oza, Cabrera, Bibei, Navea and Mao.
 Right bank: Caboalles, Valdeprado, Barredos, Cúa, Burbia, Selmo, Soldón, Lor and Cabe.

Gold deposits
The river has been a rich source of alluvial gold, and was most extensively exploited during the Roman period, following the conquest of north-west Spain by Augustus in 25 BC. The upper reaches of the river possessed large placer deposits, and the region around Las Médulas yielded large amounts of gold. It was extracted using hydraulic mining, involving the building of numerous aqueducts to expose and wash the alluvial formations.

Etymology 
According to Pokorny and to E. Bascuas, "Sil" would belong to the old European hydronymy, derived from the Indoeuropean  root *sei- 'drip, run, humid'.

See also 
 List of rivers of Spain
 Rivers of Galicia

References

Rivers of Spain
Rivers of Galicia (Spain)
Rivers of Castile and León
Tributaries of the Minho (river)